The Sagal Twins are the American actresses:
 Jean Sagal 
 Liz Sagal

American twins